Kathy Martin may refer to:

 Kathy Martin (All My Children), a fictional character on the soap opera All My Children
 Kathy Sullivan (Australian politician) (born 1942), née Martin
 Kathy Martin (scientist), professor of ornithology

See also
 Catherine Martin (disambiguation)
 Martin (name)
 Kathy Mar (born 1951), filk musician